= Jack Island =

Coordinates: 30.7605°N 82.4071°W

Jack Island is an island in the U.S. state of Georgia.

Jack Island was named after Jack Lee, a pioneer settler.
